Oylen is an unincorporated community in Lyons Township, Wadena County, Minnesota, United States.

Notes

Unincorporated communities in Wadena County, Minnesota
Unincorporated communities in Minnesota